James Andrew Sullivan (8 April 1896 – 1 May 1983) was an Australian rules footballer who played for Essendon and Melbourne in the Victorian Football League (VFL).

Sullivan was one of the small players in the Essendon team of the 1920s which earned them the nickname "mosquito fleet". A wingman of considerable pace, he vice captained Essendon in 1923 but was not selected in premiership side that year. He did however become a premiership player the following season in the league's new round robin finals format before finishing his career with a stint at Melbourne.

References

Holmesby, Russell and Main, Jim (2007). The Encyclopedia of AFL Footballers. 7th ed. Melbourne: Bas Publishing.

External links

1896 births
Australian rules footballers from Victoria (Australia)
Essendon Football Club players
Essendon Football Club Premiership players
Melbourne Football Club players
1983 deaths
Maryborough Football Club players
People from Maryborough, Victoria
One-time VFL/AFL Premiership players